The Internet Broadway Database (IBDB) is an online database of Broadway theatre productions and their personnel. It was conceived and created by Karen Hauser in 1996 and is operated by the Research Department of The Broadway League, a trade association for the North American commercial theatre community. 

This comprehensive history of Broadway provides records of productions from the beginnings of New York theatre in the 18th century up to today. Details include cast and creative lists for opening night and current day, song lists, awards and other interesting facts about every Broadway production.  Other features of IBDB include an extensive archive of photos from past and present Broadway productions, headshots, links to cast recordings on iTunes or Amazon, gross and attendance information.

Its mission was to be an interactive, user-friendly, searchable database for League members, journalists, researchers, and Broadway fans.

The League recently added Broadway Touring shows to the database for ease of tracking shows that play in theatres across the country.

It is managed by Michael Abourizk of the Broadway League.

See also
Internet Theatre Database – ITDb
Internet Movie Database – IMDb
Internet Book Database – IBookDb
Lortel Archives – IOBDb
The Broadway League

References

External links

Broadway League website

Theatre in the United States
Culture of New York City
Online databases
Broadway theatre
Internet properties established in 2000
Theatre databases